Preston B. Davis (May 19, 1907 – November 13, 1990) was a former member of the Pennsylvania State Senate, serving from 1963 to 1972. He was first elected on February 19, 1963.

References

Republican Party Pennsylvania state senators
1907 births
1990 deaths
20th-century American politicians